Belgrano Lake is a lake in the Santa Cruz Province of Patagonia, Argentina. It is located in Río Chico Department, in the west of the province. It is located in the Perito Moreno National Park.

References
Interpatagonia.com

Lakes of Santa Cruz Province, Argentina